Alpha Lacertae, Latinised from α Lacertae, is a single white-hued star in the constellation of Lacerta, located 103 light-years from the Sun. It is the brightest star in Lacerta with an apparent visual magnitude of 3.76. The star is moving closer to the Earth with a heliocentric radial velocity of −4.5 km/s.

This is an ordinary A-type main-sequence star with a stellar classification of A1 V, which indicates it is generating energy through hydrogen fusion at its core. It is around 400 million years old with a relatively high rate of spin, showing a projected rotational velocity of 128 km/s. The star has 2.2 times the mass of the Sun and 2.1 times the Sun's radius.

Alpha Lacertae has a visual companion, CCDM J22313+5017B, of spectral type A and apparent visual magnitude 11.8, approximately 36 arcseconds away. The companion is optical, a chance line-of-sight coincidence.

Naming
Alpha Lacertae is the Bayer designation for this star; it has the Flamsteed designation 7 Lacertae.

References

External links

A-type main-sequence stars
Double stars
Lacerta (constellation)
Lacertae, Alpha
BD+49 3875
Lacertae, 07
213558
111169
8585